Radcliffe Power Station was a coal-fired power station in Radcliffe, Greater Manchester, England.

History
The station was opened on 9 October 1905 by the Earl of Derby. It generated electricity using two 1,500 kW turbo generating sets made by British Thomson-Houston. Radcliffe Power Station was the first power station in the UK to transmit power by bare electrical conductors at 10kV.  The station was fed coal by the nearby East Lancashire Railway line.

The station was progressively expanded, reaching a combined capacity of 42,375 kW following the installation of two extra 10,000 kW British Thomson-Houston generating sets in 1922.

In May 1926, The Times reported that the cost of generation per unit of electricity was .25d (approximately £0.001 today), the cost per unit sold being .483d (approximately £0.002). The station had delivered 125,727,060 units of electricity.

The station was originally operated by The Lancashire Electric Power Company but was operated by the British Electricity Authority, Central Electricity Authority and Central Electricity Generating Board after nationalisation in 1947. It was closed a few years later in 1959.

References

External links

 An image of Mount Sion road that shows the station in the distance

Coal-fired power stations in England
Buildings and structures in the Metropolitan Borough of Bury
1905 establishments in England
1959 disestablishments in England
Power stations in North West England
Irwell Valley
Radcliffe, Greater Manchester